Four Ways is an outback locality in the Shire of Cloncurry, Queensland, Australia.

Geography 
The name Four Ways refers to the Burke Developmental Road which passes south-west to north through the locality with two junctions to the Burketown Road to the north-west and the Wills Developmental Road to the south-east.

The locality is bounded by the Leichhardt River to the west and by the Flinders River to the east.

A watershed running from north to south through the locality separates two drainage basins. The Alexandra River rises in the south-west of the locality and flows north to become a tributary of the Leichhardt River which flows into the Gulf of Carpentaria. While in the eastern part of the locality, Dismal Creek and the Cloncurry River flow from south to north-east ultimately becoming tributaries of the Flinders River which also flows into the Gulf of Carpentaria.

There are two named mountains in the south of the locality:

There are also two named plains in the locality

The land use is grazing on native vegetation.

History 

Education 
There are no schools within the locality nor nearby. Distance education and boarding schools would be the options.

Attractions 

The Burke and Wills Roadhouse at the Burke and Wills Junction where the "four ways" meet is a popular stopping place on these long road routes. It has basic accommodation, meals, fuel, groceries and souvenirs.

References 

Shire of Cloncurry
Localities in Queensland